Jean Édouard Marie Nicolas (9 June 1913 – 8 September 1978) was a French international footballer who played as a striker.

Born in Nanterre, Nicolas played club football for FC Rouen, and appeared in the 1934 and 1938 World Cup squads for France, and scored two goals in the 1938 edition of the tournament.

He scored a total of 21 goals in 25 international games between 1933 and 1938, making him the twelfth-highest goalscorer for France.

Career statistics

References

External links
 

1913 births
1978 deaths
People from Nanterre
French footballers
France international footballers
FC Rouen players
Ligue 1 players
Ligue 2 players
1934 FIFA World Cup players
1938 FIFA World Cup players
Association football forwards
Footballers from Hauts-de-Seine